Big Pool Wood is a Nature reserve located near Gronant, Flintshire, Wales. The site is part of the Dee Estuary SSSI & SAC due to the unique wildlife and organisms found in the area. The reserve is centered around a pond which paths and boardwalks encircling it. There are a number of bird hides located around the reserve.

The site is part of the Designated Special Area of Conservation – a protected region that supports waterfowl and waders in the winter. Big Pool Wood both provides shelter and cover for some of these wetland birds and forms part of a wildlife corridor that stretches along the North Wales coast all the way to Anglesey; particularly important for migratory birds.

References 

Sites of Special Scientific Interest in Flintshire
Sites of Special Scientific Interest in Clwyd